Pultenaea flexilis known as the graceful bush-pea, is a species of flowering plant in the family Fabaceae and is endemic to eastern Australia. It is an erect shrub with linear to narrow egg-shaped leaves with the narrower end towards the base, and yellow to orange flowers with red markings.

Description
The petals are yellow to orange sometimes with red markings.

Taxonomy
Pultenaea flexilis was first formally described in 1805 by James Edward Smith in the journal Annals of Botany from specimens collected at Port Jackson. The specific epithet (flexilis) is a Latin word meaning "flexible", referring to the leaves.

Distribution and habitat
Graceful bush-pea grows in forest on the coast and tablelands of south-east Queensland and New South Wales as far south as Deua National Park.

References

Fabales of Australia
Flora of New South Wales
Flora of Queensland
flexilis
Plants described in 1805
Taxa named by James Edward Smith